Keith Tyree Powers (born August 22, 1992) is an American actor and model. He is best known for his roles as Ronnie DeVoe in BET's miniseries The New Edition Story and Tyree in the film Straight Outta Compton.

Career 
After graduating from high school in 2010, he moved to Los Angeles with his father to focus on modeling, signing with the Wilhelmina Agency.

In 2013, Powers landed a role in the movie House Party: Tonight's the Night. After flying to South Africa for shooting, he decided to pursue acting full-time. He played Gutta in the BET hip hop anthology series Tales, and Cameron Drake in the Netflix original film Reality High. He had a recurring role on the MTV series Faking It and has since become known for his part as Tyree in the film Straight Outta Compton. He was cast as Ronnie DeVoe in The New Edition Story and since April 2017 has co-starred in Famous in Love on Freeform. He also stars in the Netflix series What/If (2019).

Personal life
Keith Powers was in a relationship with actress/singer Ryan Destiny from late 2017-2022. After 4 years together, the break up was announced by People Magazine online exclusive on January 18, 2022.

Filmography

Film

Television

Music videos

References

External links

Keith Powers on Instagram

Living people
People from Sacramento, California
African-American male actors
American male actors
1992 births
21st-century African-American people